Thuri may refer to:
 Thuri people, of South Sudan
 Thuri language, of South Sudan
 Thuri, a surname; notable people include:
 František Xaver Thuri (1939–2019), Czech composer, oboist, organist and musicologist
 Jan Thuri (born 1975), Czech oboist

See also 
 Thari (disambiguation)
 Turi (disambiguation)

Language and nationality disambiguation pages